Perizoma incultaria is a species of moth of the family Geometridae. It is found from the Alps to the Carpathian Mountains and the mountains of the Balkan Peninsula.

The wingspan is 19–21 mm. Adults are on wing from May to August.

The larvae feed on Primula, Bartsia and Saxifraga species. The larvae of the first generation mine the leaves of their host plant. The mine consists of a full depth mine. It starts as a long, slender corridor, widening into a blotch that may occupy most of the leaf, destroying the initial corridor. A single larva may make several mines. In the corridor, the frass is deposited in a broad central line, which becomes narrower later. In the blotch, the frass lies dispersed in coarse blackish green lumps. Larvae of the second generation do not mine, but live in the fruit capsules of their host plant. Pupation takes place on the ground in slight spinning. The species overwinters in the pupal stage.

References

External links

Lepiforum.de
schmetterlinge-deutschlands.de
natur-schmetterlinge.ch

Moths described in 1848
Perizoma
Moths of Europe
Taxa named by Gottlieb August Wilhelm Herrich-Schäffer